The BL 6 inch gun Mk V  was an early Elswick Ordnance Company breech-loading naval gun originally designed to use the old gunpowder propellants. They were used for coast defence around the British Empire.

Description and service

This was an Elswick Ordnance export design, completely different from and longer (30-calibres, 183.5 inch bore) than the contemporary 26-calibres British naval service 6-inch Mk III, IV and VI guns designed by the Royal Gun Factory, although it fired the same 100-pound projectiles. The gun was of a complex all-steel built-up construction, of a steel A-tube surrounded by multiple steel hoops, breech-piece and jacket.

Several were acquired by the British government for coast defence in the UK and were given the designation 6-inch gun Mark V. The breech fittings and firing mechanism were modified in British service to standardize them with the British service guns, Mark IV and VI. The breech-screw was locked by turning to the left, unlike standard service guns made by the Royal Gun Factory, which all locked to the right. Rifling consisted of 28 grooves of the polygroove "Elswick section" type, increasing from 0 to 1 turn in 30 calibres (i.e. 1 turn in 180 inches) at the muzzle.

They were also exported for use as coast-defence guns in Hong Kong, New Zealand, Australian colonies and Siam (Thailand), typically as disappearing guns.

Romania purchased 10 L/32 guns and used them during the First World War. The Romanian guns had a greater range (7,800 meters).

QFC conversion

During the 1890s, when the new "QF" technology of loading propellant charges in brass cases to increase the rate of fire was in favour, 4 guns were returned from New South Wales, Australia to the UK to be converted to QF.

2 of the resulting QFC guns are known to have been still in commission until 1945, in the Princess Royal Fortress defending the port of Albany, Western Australia.

Image gallery

See also
List of coastal artillery

Surviving examples
 7 disappearing guns at Chulachomklao Fort, Bangkok, Thailand. See :File:Armstrong cannon, Chulachomklao fort.jpg
A Mk V gun on reproduction disappearing mount at Fort Lytton, near Brisbane, Queensland, Australia. See also 
Mk V disappearing gun restored in 1998 at Taiaroa Head, Dunedin, New Zealand.
Armstrong Mk V gun, North Shore, Auckland New Zealand. Formerly at Fort Bastion
An unrestored Mk V disappearing gun at Fort Jervois, Ripapa Island, New Zealand

Notes

References

Bibliography
Text Book of Gunnery, 1887. LONDON : PRINTED FOR HIS MAJESTY'S STATIONERY OFFICE, BY HARRISON AND SONS, ST. MARTIN'S LANE 
"Treatise on the Construction and Manufacture of Ordnance in the British Service", War Office, UK, 1893.
 Text Book of Gunnery, 1902. LONDON : PRINTED FOR HIS MAJESTY'S STATIONERY OFFICE, BY HARRISON AND SONS, ST. MARTIN'S LANE

External links

 Handbook for the 6 inch B. L. marks IV, V, and VI guns 1892 at State Library of Victoria
 Instructions for 6 inch Rifled Breech Loading Armstrong Gun and Automatic Centre Pivot Barbette Mounting from Australian National Archives
 Instructions for 6 inch Rifled Breech Loading Armstrong Gun and Hydro-Pneumatic Disappearing Carriage from Australian National Archives
Video clip showing left side view of restored disappearing gun at Taiaroa Head, New Zealand
Video clip showing breech operation and loading of restored disappearing gun at Taiaroa Head, New Zealand
Disappearing Mountings described  at Victorian Forts and Artillery website
Diagram of Armstrong Mk V gun on disappearing carriage

Artillery of the United Kingdom
152 mm artillery
Victorian-era weapons of the United Kingdom
Coastal artillery
Disappearing guns